Charity Rae Clark (born July 15, 1975) is an American lawyer and politician from Vermont. A member of the Democratic Party, she has served as Vermont Attorney General since January 2023.

Early life and career
Charity Rae Clark was born in Springfield, Vermont on July 15, 1975. She was raised in Manchester, Vermont and resides in Williston, Vermont. She is a descendant of Thomas Chittenden, the first governor of Vermont. Her father, Marshall Clark, owned a supermarket in Londonderry, Vermont. Her mother, Melody MacGinnis Reed, was executive director of the non-profit arts organization Gallery at the VAULT in Springfield. Clark graduated from Burr and Burton Seminary in 1993. Her siblings include a twin sister, Chelsea. She earned her Bachelor of Arts degree in political science from the University of Vermont in 1997 and served as a policy analyst in the administration of Governor Howard Dean. She then enrolled at Boston College Law School, earning her Juris Doctor degree in 2005.

After passing the bar, Clark joined the Burlington, Vermont firm of Downs, Rachlin Martin as an associate attorney. She later worked in New York City, where she was an attorney with the firm of Orrick, Herrington & Sutcliffe.

In 2014, William Sorrell, then the attorney general of Vermont, hired Clark as an assistant attorney general. She served as the chief of staff to T. J. Donovan for four years while Donovan served as attorney general. She resigned in May 2022.

Attorney general of Vermont
The week after resigning as Donovan's chief of staff, Clark announced her candidacy for state attorney general in the 2022 Vermont Attorney General election, as Donovan was not seeking reelection. Clark defeated Rory Thibault, the states attorney for Washington County, in the Democratic Party primary election, 58% to 28%. In the November 8 general election, she faced Republican Mike Tagliavia, a first-time candidate who is not an attorney, and won the election with 65% of the vote, becoming the first woman ever elected Attorney General of Vermont.

Family
In July 2011, Clark married Robert Lietar, a television producer and documentary filmmaker. Their ceremony took place at Hildene, the Robert Todd Lincoln home in Manchester, Vermont. They later divorced, and are the parents of a daughter.

Notes

References

External links
Government website
Campaign website

1975 births
Boston College Law School alumni
Living people
People from Manchester, Vermont
People from Williston, Vermont
Political chiefs of staff
University of Vermont alumni
Vermont Attorneys General
Vermont Democrats
Vermont lawyers
Women in Vermont politics